Skála Ítróttarfelag (Skála ÍF) is a Faroese football club based in Skáli, municipality of Runavík. The club was founded on 15 May 1965. They currently play in the Betrideildin, which is the top football league of the Faroe Islands. They were promoted to the top league after winning the 2015 season of 1, deild with 70 points. They were also promoted to the top tier after the 2013 season, but were relegated after one year in the Effodeildin.

The 2005 season was the best in the club's history as Skála finished second and qualified for the 2006–07 UEFA Cup.

Honours
1. deild: 2
 2015, 2021.
2. deild: 3
 1998, 2000, 2010.
3. deild: 1
 1985.

Current squad
As of 24 May 2020.

UEFA club competition record

Home results in bold.

Managers
 John Petersen (2007–08)
 Pauli Poulsen (2014–17)
 Eyðun Klakstein (2017–19)
 Bill McLeod Jacobsen (2020-present)

Former players

  Mark Ryutin

References

External links

Official website 
 Skála Stadion – Nordic Stadiums

 
Association football clubs established in 1965
1965 establishments in the Faroe Islands